William Edward Werner (April 19, 1855 in Buffalo, Erie County, New York – March 1, 1916 in Rochester, Monroe County, New York) was an American lawyer and politician from New York.

Biography
He was the son of Peter Werner and Margaret Werner, who had come to the United States from Germany.

In 1877, he removed to Rochester, and studied law in the offices of William H. Bowman, and later Dennis C. Feely. He was admitted to the bar in 1880. He was elected on the Republican ticket Special County Judge of Monroe County in 1884, was re-elected in 1887, and in 1889 was elected County Judge.

He was a justice of the New York Supreme Court (7th District) from 1895 to 1904, elected on the Republican and Democratic tickets.

In 1900, he was one of the first three additional judges designated to the New York Court of Appeals under the constitutional amendment of 1899.

In 1902, he ran on the Republican ticket for a regular seat on the New York Court of Appeals but was defeated by the incumbent Democrat John Clinton Gray.

In 1904, he ran again, this time in a cross-endorsement deal alongside Democrat Edgar M. Cullen on both the Republican and the Democratic tickets, and was elected.

In 1913, he ran on the Republican ticket for Chief Judge, but was defeated by Democrat Willard Bartlett. Werner remained on the bench as an associate judge and died in office.

He suffered from pernicious anaemia, and on February 9, 1916, had his spleen removed. He died a few weeks later at the General Hospital in Rochester after pleurisy developed. He was buried at the Mount Hope Cemetery, Rochester.

Notes

Sources
Court of Appeals judges at New York Court History
GOVERNOR NAMES JUDGES in NYT on January 2, 1900
The William E. Werner Collection with Bio, at Rochester Library 
JUDGE WERNER DIES AFTER AN OPERATION in NYT on March 2, 1916
FUNERAL OF JUDGE WERNER in NYT on March 4, 1916

1855 births
1916 deaths
Politicians from Rochester, New York
Politicians from Buffalo, New York
Judges of the New York Court of Appeals
New York Supreme Court Justices
New York (state) Republicans
Lawyers from Buffalo, New York
Lawyers from Rochester, New York
19th-century American judges
19th-century American lawyers